The Yumthang Valley or Sikkim Valley of Flowers sanctuary, is a nature sanctuary with river, hot springs, yaks and grazing pasture on rolling meadows surrounded by the Himalayan mountains in the North Sikkim district of Sikkim state in India.

It is popularly known as 'Valley of Flowers'
and is home to the Shingba Rhododendron Sanctuary, which has over twenty-four species of the rhododendron, the state flower. The flowering season is from late February and to mid June, when countless flowers bloom to carpet the valley in multicolored hues of rainbow. A tributary of the river Teesta flows past the valley and the town of Lachung, the nearest inhabited centre. Yumthang is closed between December and March due to heavy snowfall. There is also a hot spring in the valley.

A forest rest house is the only permanent residence in the valley. During the spring months, the area blooms with rhododendrons, primulas, poppies, iris and other flora. During the summer months, villagers take their cattle to these heights to graze (a practice known as yaylag pastoralism). In view of increasing number of tourists, there is possibility of environmental degradation in near future.  Skiing is conducted in the valley.

Transportation by road 

Tourists may travel from Gangtok to Lachung (the nearest village where accommodation is available) by booking a full vehicle or shared one and stay over night. A direct journey to Yumthang is not feasible as roads are commonly foggy and it becomes dark very early around 5:30 pm. A trip to the Valley takes around two hours from Lachung, which is about 125 km from Gangtok.

Gallery

See also
 Valley of Flowers National Park in Uttarakhand

External links

 Yumthang photos and reviews on tripadvisor.com
 Yumthang photo travelogue with directions
 Yumthang Valley Detailed Guide for Travellers

References

Valleys of Sikkim
Mangan district
Ski areas and resorts in India